Mutatá is a municipality in the Colombian department of Antioquia.

Climate
Mutatá has a tropical rainforest climate (Köppen Af) with very heavy rainfall year round.

References

Municipalities of Antioquia Department